Mark Nicholls (born 5 January 1990) is an Australian professional rugby league footballer who plays as a  for the Dolphins in the NRL. 

He previously played for the South Sydney Rabbitohs, Canberra Raiders and the Melbourne Storm in the National Rugby League.

Background
Nicholls was born into a family in Wagga Wagga, New South Wales, Australia.  

He played his junior rugby league for the Leeton Greenies and Gungahlin Bulls, before being signed by the Canberra Raiders.

Playing career

Early career
From 2008 to 2010, Nicholls played for the Canberra Raiders' NYC team. In October 2010, he played for the Junior Kangaroos against the Junior Kiwis.

2012
In round 17 of the 2012 NRL season, Nicholls made his NRL debut for the Raiders against the St. George Illawarra Dragons. He went on to play 12 consecutive games that year, coming off the bench as a prop.

2013
On 25 April, Nicholls re-signed with Canberra on a two-year contract.

2014
On 9 July, Nicholls played for the New South Wales Residents against the Queensland Residents.

2015
On 6 October, Nicholls signed a one-year contract with the Melbourne Storm starting in 2016.

2016
On 1 February, Nicholls was named in the Storm's 2016 NRL Auckland Nines squad.  He made no appearances for Melbourne in the 2016 NRL season.

2017
Nicholls was named in the Storm squad for the 2017 NRL Auckland Nines.

He made his Melbourne debut against the Penrith Panthers in round 5 of the 2017 NRL season.  He made a total of nine appearances for Melbourne as the club won the Minor Premiership and the premiership itself defeating North Queensland in the 2017 NRL Grand Final.

2018
Nicholls made his South Sydney debut in round 1 of the 2018 NRL season, starting at prop in South Sydney's 32–20 loss to the New Zealand Warriors.  He made a total of 12 appearances for South Sydney in the 2018 NRL season.

2019
Nicholls made a total of 24 appearances for South Sydney in the 2019 NRL season as the club finished third on the table and qualified for the finals.  Nicholls played in all three of the club's finals games including South Sydney's preliminary final loss against his former club Canberra.

2020
In round 10 of the 2020 NRL season, he scored his first try for South Sydney as they lost 20–18 against Newcastle at Bankwest Stadium.

He made a total 19 appearances for Souths and played in all three of the club's finals matches including the preliminary final loss to Penrith.

2021
In round 24 of the 2021 NRL season, Nicholls scored two tries for South Sydney in a 52-12 victory over arch-rivals the Sydney Roosters. In round 25, he was named captain for the match against St. George Illawarra, after South Sydney chose to rest Adam Reynolds in the lead up to the finals.

Nicholls played a total of 27 games for South Sydney in the 2021 NRL season including the club's 2021 NRL Grand Final defeat against Penrith.

2022
On 21 January, Nicholls signed a two-year deal to join the new Dolphins (NRL) side who are due to join the NRL competition in 2023.
Nicholls played 18 games for South Sydney and scored one try in the 2022 NRL season including all three of the clubs finals matches as they reached the preliminary final for a fifth straight season.  Souths would lose in the preliminary final to eventual premiers Penrith 32-12.

2023
Nicholls made his club debut for the newly admitted Dolphins team in round 1 of the 2023 NRL season scoring a try as they pulled off a big upset defeating the Sydney Roosters 28-18.

References

External links
South Sydney Rabbitohs profile
Melbourne Storm profile
NRL profile

1990 births
Living people
Australian Muslims
Australian rugby league players
Canberra Raiders players
Junior Kangaroos players
Melbourne Storm players
Mount Pritchard Mounties players
Rugby league players from Wagga Wagga
Rugby league props
Rugby league second-rows
South Sydney Rabbitohs players
Sunshine Coast Falcons players
South Sydney Rabbitohs captains